Hexapropymate is a hypnotic/sedative. It has effects similar to those of barbiturates and was used in the 1970s-1980s in the treatment of insomnia before being replaced with newer drugs with improved safety profiles.

References 

Carbamates
GABAA receptor positive allosteric modulators
Propargyl compounds